Xenoceltitidae are evolute, generally ribbed,  upper Lower Triassic Ceratitida with ceratitic or goniatitic sutures; formerly included in the Noritaceae but now placed in the Xenodiscaceae.

The Xenoceltitidae are derived from the Ophiceratidae.

References 

 Arkell et al. 1957; Mesozoic Ammonoidea, Treatise on Invertebrate Paleontology, Part L, Ammonoiea; Geological Society of America
 The Paleobiology Database

Xenodiscoidea
Ceratitida families
Early Triassic first appearances
Early Triassic extinctions